Arc is a programming language, a dialect of the language Lisp, developed by Paul Graham and Robert Morris. It is free and open-source software released under the Artistic License 2.0.

History
In 2001, Paul Graham announced that he was working on a new dialect of Lisp named Arc. Over the years since, he has written several essays describing features or goals of the language, and some internal projects at Graham's startup business incubator named Y Combinator have been written in Arc, most notably the Hacker News web forum and news aggregator program. Arc is written in Racket.

Motives
In the essay Being Popular Graham describes a few of his goals for the language. While many of the goals are very general ("Arc should be hackable", "there should be good libraries"), he did give some specifics. For example, he believes it important for a language to be terse:

He also stated that it is better for a language to only implement a small number of axioms, even when that means the language may not have features that large organizations want, such as object-orientation (OO). Further, Graham thinks that OO is not useful as its methods and patterns are just "good design", and he views the language features used to implement OO as partly mistaken. At Arc's introduction in 2008, Graham stated one of its benefits was its brevity.

A controversy among Lisp programmers is whether, and how much, the s-expressions of the language should be complemented by other forms of syntax. Graham thinks that added syntax should be used in situations where pure s-expressions would be overly verbose, saying, "I don't think we should be religiously opposed to introducing syntax into Lisp." Graham also thinks that efficiency problems should be solved by giving the programmer a good profiler.

Reception 
When released in 2008, Arc generated mixed reactions, with some calling it simply an extension to Lisp or Scheme and not a programming language in its own right. Others applauded Arc for stripping Lisp down to bare essentials. Shortly after its release, Arc was ported to JavaScript, and was being supported by Schemescript, an integrated development environment (IDE) based on Eclipse.

Examples 
Hello world in Arc :
 (prn "Hello, World")

To illustrate Arc's terseness, Graham uses a brief program. It produces a form with one field at the url "/said". When the form is submitted, it leads to a page with a link that says "click here", which then leads to a page with the value of the original input field. 
(defop said req
  (aform [onlink "click here" (pr "you said: " (arg _ "foo"))]
    (input "foo") 
    (submit)))

Versions

Official version
The first publicly released version of Arc was made available on 29 January 2008, implemented on Racket (named PLT-Scheme then). The release comes in the form of a .tar archive, containing the Racket source code for Arc. A tutorial and a discussion forum are also available. The forum uses the same program that Hacker News does, and is written in Arc.

Unofficial versions 
Due to lack of updates in the official Arc branch, some members of the Arc community started their own repositories with unofficial modifications, extensions, and libraries. One version, Anarki, permitted anyone to submit changes to the project and has a community managed wiki.

Rainbow is an implementation of Arc in Java.

Arcadia is an implementation of Arc in C.

References

External links

Tutorial

Dynamically typed programming languages
Functional languages
Lisp programming language family
Cross-platform free software